Brad Fraser (born June 28, 1959 in Edmonton, Alberta) is a Canadian playwright, screenwriter and cultural commentator. He is one of the most widely produced Canadian playwrights both in Canada and internationally. His plays typically feature a harsh yet comical view of contemporary life in Canada, including frank depictions of sexuality, drug use and violence.

Career

Fraser's most noted early play was Wolf Boy; first staged in Edmonton in 1981, its 1984 production in Toronto by Theatre Passe Muraille was later noted as one of the first significant acting roles for Keanu Reeves.

Fraser first came to national and international prominence as a playwright with Unidentified Human Remains and the True Nature of Love, an episodically structured play about a group of thirtysomethings trying to find their way through life in Edmonton, while the city is haunted by a serial killer. Written while Fraser was playwright in residence with Alberta Theatre Projects, it was a hit at ATP's  '89, and became his national and international breakthrough.

Coming three years after the 1991 Robert Mapplethorpe controversy in Cincinnati, Poor Super Man inspired international headlines when the board of directors of Ensemble Theatre of Cincinnati temporarily canceled the production because of its anticipated obscenity. After a public outcry, the production was reinstated. Poor Super Man opened without incident.

Fraser also has written two films, Love and Human Remains and Leaving Metropolis, which were both adaptations of his plays; Denys Arcand directed Love and Human Remains, while Leaving Metropolis was Fraser's debut as a film director. He has also written for the television series Queer as Folk; was host of his own television talk show, Jawbreaker, for PrideVision; and for a period of time wrote a biweekly column for the Canadian gay magazine fab.

His most recent play, Kill Me Now, premiered in 2014. As of 2021, two film adaptations of Kill Me Now were in development in Canada and South Korea.

A memoir by Brad Fraser, All the Rage, was published by Doubleday Canada in May 2021.

Awards
Fraser won the Alberta Culture award for best full-length play in 1989, for Unidentified Human Remains and the True Nature of Love.

He is a two-time winner of the Floyd S. Chalmers Canadian Play Award, in 1991 for Unidentified Human Remains and the True Nature of Love and in 1996 for Poor Super Man. He won the Genie Award for Best Adapted Screenplay at the 15th Genie Awards for Love and Human Remains.

Fraser won London's Evening Standard Award for Unidentified Human Remains and the True Nature of Love in 1993.

He is a two-time nominee for the Governor General's Award for English-language drama, receiving nods at the 1995 Governor General's Awards for Poor Super Man and at the 2016 Governor General's Awards for Kill Me Now.

Personal life
Fraser is openly gay, and his plays often focus on LGBTQ storylines. In 2003 he became the executive story editor on Showtime's Queer As Folk.

Plays
 Wolfboy - 1981
 Mutants - 1981
 Rude Noises (for a Blank Generation) - 1982
 Chainsaw Love - 1985
 Young Art - 1987
 Unidentified Human Remains and the True Nature of Love - 1989
 Return of the Bride - 1989
 The Ugly Man - 1990
 Prom Night of the Living Dead - 1991, with Darrin Hagen
 Poor Super Man - 1994
 Martin Yesterday - 1997
 Outrageous - 2000, musical with composer Joey Miller
 Snake in Fridge - 2000
 Cold Meat Party - 2003
 True Love Lies - 2009
 5 @ 50 - 2011
 Kill Me Now - 2014

References

External links

20th-century Canadian dramatists and playwrights
21st-century Canadian dramatists and playwrights
Canadian male screenwriters
Canadian columnists
Canadian gay writers
1959 births
Living people
LGBT film directors
Gay screenwriters
Canadian LGBT dramatists and playwrights
Best Screenplay Genie and Canadian Screen Award winners
Canadian television talk show hosts
Gay dramatists and playwrights
Canadian male dramatists and playwrights
Canadian male non-fiction writers
Canadian television writers
Canadian LGBT screenwriters
Film directors from Edmonton
Writers from Edmonton
Canadian memoirists
Gay memoirists
20th-century Canadian screenwriters
21st-century Canadian screenwriters
20th-century Canadian male writers
21st-century Canadian male writers
21st-century Canadian LGBT people